The Mascall Formation is a Miocene geologic formation found along the John Day River Valley of Oregon, in the Western United States.

Description
The formation is described in Geologic Formations of Eastern Oregon (1972) as follows: 

"The Mascall Formation consists of a maximum of 2,000 feet of fluvial sandstone, ash, light colored water-laid tuff, and well-rounded conglomerate. The conglomerate is increasingly coarse-grained towards the east and is composed of clasts of chert, metavolcanics, and rhyolite.  Within the Mascall Formation is a widespread ignimbrite unit which consists of 97 to 99 percent glass shards and minor amounts of anorthoclase, quartz, magnetite, zircon, and clinopyroxene.  That 10 percent of the anorthoclase consists of orthoclase is considered to be a unique feature of the unit by Davenport (1970)."

Age
The ignimbrite was radiometrically dated at 13 million years.  Parts of the Mascall are interfingered with the Columbia River Basalt Group.

Fossils
Barstovian vertebrates have been recovered from the Mascall.

References

Geology of Oregon
Neogene geology of Oregon
Sandstone formations of the United States
Tuff formations